Bathingbourne is a farming hamlet in the southeastern part of the Isle of Wight. It is located on Bathingbourne Lane, northwest of Apse Heath and southwest of Hale Common. Bathingborne is part of the town of Sandown.

Several businesses, holiday accommodations and farms are present in Bathingbourne. Bathingbourne farms produce livestock and garlic.

Bathingbourne was the name of a manor in the ancient civil parish of Godshill. It was alternatively known as "Baddingbourne" and "Bangbourne" in the 16th century, but before that it was earlier known as Beaddingaburn (10th century, Bedingeborne (11th century), Baddingebourne (13th century), and Bathyngbourne (14th century). Bathingbourne was one of five manors granted by King Eadwig (reigned 955–959) to members of his thegn, although a previous charter of King Edred (reigned 946–955) also parcelled out this land, but Edred's charter divided the land along different boundaries. The Domesday Book in 1086 listed Bathingbourne in its records of English settlements.

References

External links
Map of Bathingbourne's location

Villages on the Isle of Wight